Mireille Martin-Deschamps is a French mathematician who studies the algebraic geometry of space curves. She was president of the Société mathématique de France.

Education and career
Martin-Deschamps studied at the École normale supérieure de jeunes filles from 1965 to 1969, and completed a doctorate in 1976 at Paris-Sud University, supervised by Pierre Samuel. She was a researcher for the French National Centre for Scientific Research from 1969 until 2003, when she became a professor at Versailles Saint-Quentin-en-Yvelines University. She retired in 2010, and the university held a colloquium in honor of her retirement.

She was president of the Société mathématique de France from 1998 to 2001. As well, she served on the executive committee of the European Mathematical Society beginning in 2006.

Research
Martin-Deschamps's doctoral work was in algebraic geometry in the style of Alexander Grothendieck. Her later work involved Hilbert schemes of space curves in projective space.

References

Year of birth missing (living people)
Living people
French mathematicians
French women mathematicians